István Szegedi Szüts (7 December 1893 Budapest - 1959) was a Hungarian painter and illustrator, a friend of the composers Béla Bartók, Zoltán Kodály and György Ránki. He served in World War I and his books include 'My War' and 'Last Letters from Stalingrad'. 'My War', two volumes of pen, ink and wash drawings, published in 1931 by John Lane, is a wordless novel of his wartime experiences. His economy of line has been compared with that of Eric Gill and Keith Vaughan.

He visited England in 1929, holding a solo exhibition at the Gieves Gallery in London. In 1936 he moved to Cornwall with Gwynedd Jones-Parry, another painter, whom he married in 1937. One of their wedding presents was Alfred Wallis' 'Three Sailing Vessels on a River' given by Jim Ede, who was a junior curator at the Tate and purchased many of Wallis' paintings.

The couple lived at Caunce Head near Mullion, Cornwall on the Lizard Peninsula and stayed there for the rest of their lives. He exhibited with the Newlyn Society of Artists and the Penwith Society of Arts.

References

External links
 'Drawings by István Szegedi-Szüts'
Introduction to 'My War' by Ralph Hale Mottram

1893 births
1959 deaths
Hungarian painters